The Art of Getting Along is a 1954 comedy film directed by Luigi Zampa and starring Alberto Sordi. Following Difficult Years and Easy Years, it is the third and final chapter in the trilogy about Italian politics under the continuing shadow of fascism conceived by Vitaliano Brancati. In the person of an unprincipled Sicilian rogue, it delivers a satirical portrait of Italian society from 1913 to 1953.

In 2008 the film was selected to enter the list of the 100 Italian films to be saved.

Plot
Sasà Scimoni, nephew and unpaid assistant of the mayor of Catania, adapts himself to any man who may be able to help him advance and to any woman he may be able to take advantage of. Falling for the wife of an honest socialist politician, he becomes an activist and through his machinations the husband gets five years in jail. By then the First World War, which Sasà avoids after feigning madness, has come and gone. Marrying a dim but rich heiress, he becomes her brother's right-hand man in a flour milling business. When the Fascists seize power he becomes an activist, but hastily burns his insignia after the Allies land in Sicily (one of their bombs carrying off his wife) and then profits from the black market. At a beauty parade he falls for Lilli, the winner who says she wants to get into films. 

Hearing that backers of a film can make a fortune if it is a success, he persuades a dim but rich duke to promise initial finance and with Lilli as his "fiancée" heads for Rome. The public mood being strongly in favour of the Communist party, he becomes a supporter and plans a film about the workers. When the elections are however won by the Christian Democrats, the Catholic party, he promptly supports them and plans a film about a saint. The duke then declines further finance unless he can first get his capital out of the country, so Sasà finds him a church dignitary who can send money legally to foreign missions. The money ends up with Sasà, who buys farmland outside Rome, evicts squatters, and bribes an official to obtain permission for development. His machinations exposed, he gets five years in jail. On release he founds his own political party for victims of capitalism, but it wins few votes. The final shot shows him with his latest girl, in Bavarian dress, selling German razor blades off the back of a lorry.

Cast
 Alberto Sordi – Rosario Scimoni
 Marco Guglielmi – Avv. Giardini
 Franco Coop – Il sindaco
 Luisa Della Noce – Paola
  – Pizzarro
 Elena Gini – Mariuccia Guardini
 Elli Parvo – Emma Scimoni
 Armenia Balducci – Lilli De Angelis
 Carlo Sposito – Duca di Lanocita (as Carletto Sposito)
 Giovanni Di Benedetto – Onorevole Toscano (as Gianni De Benedetto)
 Antonio Acqua – Ing. Casamottola
 Gino Buzzanca – Barone Mazzei

References

External links

1954 films
1950s Italian-language films
1954 comedy films
Italian black-and-white films
Films set in Sicily
Films set in Rome
Films directed by Luigi Zampa
Italian comedy films
Films scored by Alessandro Cicognini
1950s Italian films